Dorath Pinto Uchôa (1 November 1947 – 28 March 2014) was a Brazilian archaeologist and one of the founders of Brazilian Society of Archaeology. She specialized in the study of prehistoric coastal human settlements with a special emphasis on the study of prehistoric middens in the State of São Paulo, Brazil.

Biography 
In 1967, she obtained a degree in Geography from the Pontificia Catholic University of São Paulo. She earned a master's degree in history in 1972 and a PhD in anthropology, Archaeology, and Ethnology, in 1972, both from the University of São Paulo, with a thesis titled: "Arqueologia de Piaçaguera e Tenório: Análise de dois tipos de sítios pré-cerâmicos de Litoral Paulista".

During her training as archaeologist, she studied middens located in Piaçaguera, near  the municipality of Cubatão, close to the port of Santos. She spent part of her career in the Instituto de Pré-História. She became professor of the Museum of Archaeology and Ethnology of the University of São Paulo.

Scientific publications

Books 
 Clássicos da Arqueologia. Erechim, RS: Habilis. 224 pp. 2007
 Arqueologia de Piaçagüera e Tenório: análise de dois tipos de sítios pré-cerâmicos do litoral paulista. Clássicos da Arqueologia. Editor Habilis, 221 pp. 2007
 O sítio arqueológico Mar Virado, Ubatuba: relatório. Editor Museu de Arqueologia e Etnologia, 32 pp. 1999
 Demografia esqueletal dos construtores do sambaqui de Piaçaguera, São Paulo, Brasil. Vol. 1.230 pp. ed. São Paulo: Grafons, 1988

Articles 
 Ilha do Mar Virado: um estudo de um sítio arqueológico no litoral do Estado de São Paulo. CLIO. Série Arqueológica (UFPE), vol. 24, pp. 7–40, 2009
 Presença de Fungos na dentina humana: implicaçãoes arqueológicas e forenses. Rev. de Odontologia da Pós Graduação da Faculdade de Odontologia da Usp, São Paulo, vol. 11, Nº 3, 2004
 Estimativa da idade através da análise do desgaste oclusal em molares de remanescentes esqueléticos arqueológicos brasileiros. RPG. Rev. de Pós-Graduação (USP), São Paulo, vol. 11, Nº. 3, 2004
 A Ilha Comprida e o Litoral de Cananéia sob a ótica arqueológica e geoambiental. Revista Clio Arqueológica, UFPE -Recife, vol. 1, Nº. 15, 2002
 Fungal infiltration in the human dentine: archaeology and forensic implications (poster). 14th European Meeting of the Paleopathology Association, Coimbra, pp. 116–116, 2002
 Estimativa de idade em remanescentes esqueléticos arqueológicos pela análise do desgaste oclusal em molares. Pesquisa Odontológica Brasileira, São Paulo, vol. 16, pp. 86–86, 2002
 A Ilha Comprida e o Litoral de Cananéia sob a ótica arqueológica e geoambiental. Rev. Clio Arqueológica, UFPE -Recife, vol. 1, Nº. 15, 2002
 Presença de fungos na dentina humana: possíveis implicações arqueológicas e forenses. RPG. Rev. de Pós-Graduação (USP), São Paulo, vol. 8, pp. 260–260, 2001
 Hiperosteose Porosa Em Cranios de Indios e Mulatos do Sudeste Brasileiro: Correlacao Entre As Lesoes Na Calvaria e Na Orbita. Revista do Museu de Arqueologia e Etnologia, 1996
 Coletores-pescadores do Litoral Meridional Brasileiro. Revista de Pré História, Sãao Paulo, vol. 6, pp. 103–106, 1984

Honours 
 2000: homage by the Conselho National de Mulheres Do Brazil
 1997: homage by the Instituto de Pré-História
 1996: medal of the Municipal Government of Cubatão
 1995: homage of the Society of Brazilian Archaeology
 1988: medal Martim Afonso de Souza

References

External links 
 
 
 
 

Pontifical Catholic University of São Paulo alumni
University of São Paulo alumni
Brazilian archaeologists
Brazilian women scientists
Brazilian scientists
1947 births
Academic staff of the University of São Paulo
2014 deaths
20th-century women scientists
21st-century women scientists
Brazilian women archaeologists
20th-century Brazilian women writers
21st-century Brazilian women writers
21st-century Brazilian writers